Alfonso Unda was a Mexican tennis player.

A five-time gold medalist for Mexico at the Central American and Caribbean Games, Unda's tally includes a singles gold at the 1926 Mexico City games, beating Mariano Lozano in the final.

Unda competed for the Mexico Davis Cup team from 1926 to 1937, for a total of 11 ties. He won two rubbers during his career, both in doubles against Cuba. Many of his ties were against the United States and it was rare in this era for Mexico to even win a set against the Americans, which Unda managed to do in two 1928 rubbers, against Bill Tilden/Arthur Jones in doubles and Wilmer Allison in singles.

See also
List of Mexico Davis Cup team representatives

References

External links
 
 
 

Year of birth missing
Year of death missing
Mexican male tennis players
Central American and Caribbean Games medalists in tennis
Central American and Caribbean Games gold medalists for Mexico
Competitors at the 1926 Central American and Caribbean Games
Competitors at the 1930 Central American and Caribbean Games
Competitors at the 1935 Central American and Caribbean Games
20th-century Mexican people